Sky Gaven (born April 20, 1985, in Los Angeles, California) is a Latin-American entrepreneur.

She studied at NYU's Tisch School of the Arts. There she became a member of STEBA (Stern and Tisch Entertainment Association) Her critically acclaimed short film titled My Shadows premiered at Outfest's Fusion Film Festival and placed Best Short in L.A., Boyle Heights Film Festival in 2006. She was the Head of the Casting Department Casting Director on here! Networks Award Winning television series, The DL Chronicles. While casting and producing the musical group G.L.A.M. for Mainstream Music, which has independent distribution through ADA, a wholly owned subsidiary of Warner Music Group she discovered and developed pop act Becky G. 

In 2010, Sky Gaven formed a Creative Tech Agency called KonRob. The company specializes in digital business strategy and creative design. KonRob has formed creative partnerships with Google, NBCUniversal, MTV and RedBull.

In 2015, Sky pioneered the Celebrity Vertical for Studio71. There she oversaw all creative direction for Shay Mitchell's fast-growing YouTube channel. In addition, she created the popular digital travel series ShayCation, the channel garnered more than 100K subscribers in 24 hours and built over 4 million lifetime subscribers. Sky re-launched Ashley Tisdale's YouTube channel and accumulated over 1 million subscribers and over 35 million views in a short span of 10 weeks. 

Most recently through UX Design, Marketing and Research & Development, she helped Google launch YouTube's Community tool across the entire platform globally. Today, she continues to help companies transform and champion new methods of engaged ownership with a centralized focus on social impact businesses’ and entrepreneurs.

References

People from Los Angeles
1986 births
Living people
Tisch School of the Arts alumni
American filmmakers